Acragas carinatus is a species of jumping spider in the genus Acragas. The scientific name of this species was first published in 1943 by Crane, and found in Venezuela.

References

External links 

carinatus
Spiders described in 1943
Invertebrates of Venezuela
Spiders of South America